Midway, released in the United Kingdom as Battle of Midway, is a 1976 American war film that chronicles the June 1942 Battle of Midway, a turning point in World War II in the Pacific. Directed by Jack Smight and produced by Walter Mirisch from a screenplay by Donald S. Sanford, the film starred Charlton Heston and Henry Fonda, supported by a large international cast of guest stars including James Coburn, Glenn Ford, Ed Nelson, Hal Holbrook, Toshiro Mifune, Robert Mitchum, Cliff Robertson, Robert Wagner, Pat Morita, Dabney Coleman, Erik Estrada, and Tom Selleck.

The music score by John Williams and the cinematography by Harry Stradling Jr. were both highly regarded. The film was made using Technicolor, and its soundtrack used Sensurround to augment the physical sensation of engine noise, explosions, crashes and gunfire. Despite mixed reviews, particularly revolving around an unnecessary romance between an American and Japanese couple, Midway became the tenth most popular movie at the box office in 1976.

Plot
On April 18, 1942 during World War II, a squadron of B-25 bombers from the  launches a lightning raid on Tokyo. The strike stuns the Imperial Japanese Navy and its commander Admiral Yamamoto. With hard evidence of the threat posed by the carriers of the American Pacific Fleet to the Japanese home islands, Yamamoto devises a plan to lure out the American fleet and destroy it once and for all by forcing it to sortie against the invasion of Midway Island.

At Pearl Harbor, Captain Matt Garth is tasked with gauging the progress of decryption efforts at Station HYPO, headed by Commander Joseph Rochefort, which has partially cracked the Japanese Navy's JN-25 code, revealing that a major operation will soon take place at a location the Japanese refer to as "AF". Garth is also asked by his son, naval aviator Ensign Tom Garth, to help free his girlfriend Haruko Sakura, an American-born daughter of Japanese immigrants, who has been interned with her parents, by calling in favors to have the charges against the family dropped. Yamamoto and his staff present their plans for Midway to the commanders who have been chosen to lead the attack, Admirals Nagumo and Yamaguchi of the Japanese carrier force and Admiral Kondo of the invasion force.

After the inconclusive Battle of the Coral Sea, Rochefort uses a simple ruse to confirm that "AF" is Midway. Meanwhile, Matt has been unsuccessful in freeing the Sakuras, infuriating Tom.

The battle begins on June 4 as Nagumo's carrier force launches its air attack on Midway Island. The American base is damaged, but the airstrip remains usable, meaning Midway can still launch aircraft. The Japanese fleet is then spotted by scouts; the American carriers launch their planes in response. Meanwhile, Nagumo is shocked to learn of a sighting by a scout plane of the Yorktown, disrupting his plans for a second strike on Midway; he orders that his planes be rapidly re-armed with torpedoes for an attack on the American carrier.

Torpedo bombers from Hornet are the first American planes to locate the Japanese fleet. They attack without fighter protection and are destroyed by the Japanese Combat Air Patrol. Tom is severely burned when gunfire starts a fire in his cockpit. The Japanese fighters are drawn down to wave-top altitude by the low-flying torpedo planes, leaving them out of position when dive-bombers from Enterprise and Yorktown arrive. As the Japanese are preparing to launch their second wave, the American bombers attack and reduce three of the Japanese carriers – ,  and  – to burning wrecks within minutes.

The remaining Japanese carrier  immediately launches aircraft. Following the returning American bombers, they soon discover Yorktown and inflict severe damage. The crew manages to bring the fires under control as a scout plane reports that Hiryū has been spotted. Below decks, Matt meets Tom and reconciles with him. Due to a shortage of pilots, Matt joins the counterattack against Hiryū just before its second wave of aircraft strikes. Yorktown is soon burning and the order is given to abandon ship.

Hiryū is sunk, dealing a fatal blow to the invasion. The American planes return to Enterprise and Hornet but Matt, his plane badly damaged, is killed during landing. Yamamoto receives news of the loss of his carrier force. The admiral orders a general withdrawal as he contemplates how he will apologise for his failure to the Emperor.

Cast

Allies

Japanese

Civilians

Production

Development
John Guillermin was reportedly hired to direct but replaced by Jack Smight before filming began.

Filming

Midway was shot at the Terminal Island Naval Base, Los Angeles, California, the U.S. Naval Station, Long Beach, California and Naval Air Station Pensacola, Florida. The on-board scenes were filmed in the Gulf of Mexico aboard . She is now a museum ship at Corpus Christi, Texas. Scenes depicting Midway Island were filmed at Point Mugu, California. "Point Mugu has sand dunes, just like Midway. We built an airstrip, a tower, some barricades, things like that," said Jack Smight. "We did a lot of strafing and bombing there." A Consolidated PBY-6A Catalina BuNo 63998, N16KL, of the Commemorative Air Force, was used in depicting all the search and rescue mission scenes.

Sound
The film was the second of only four films released with a Sensurround sound mix which required special speakers to be installed in movie theatres. The other Sensurround films were Earthquake (1974), Rollercoaster (1977), and Battlestar Galactica (1978). The regular soundtrack (dialog, background and music) was monaural; a second optical track was devoted to low frequency rumble added to battle scenes and when characters were near unmuffled military engines.

Action
Many of the action sequences used footage from earlier films: most sequences of the Japanese air raids on Midway are stock shots from 20th Century Fox's Tora! Tora! Tora! (1970). Some scenes are from the Japanese Toho film Hawai Middouei daikaikusen: Taiheiyo no arashi (1960) (which also stars Mifune). Several action scenes, including the one where a Mitsubishi A6M Zero slams into 's bridge, were taken from Away All Boats (1956); scenes of Doolittle's Tokyo raid at the beginning of the film are from Thirty Seconds Over Tokyo (1944). In addition, most dogfight sequences come from wartime gun camera footage or from the film Battle of Britain (1969).

Cast member Henry Fonda (Admiral Nimitz) had been one of the narrators of the 1942 John Ford documentary The Battle of Midway, some footage from which was used in the 1976 film. This was the third film dealing with the aftermath of Pearl Harbor with which Henry Fonda had been involved. Fonda first narrated the 1942 film The Battle of Midway and starred in the 1965 film In Harm's Way. The only actress with a speaking part in the original film was Christina Kobuko as Horuko. In the TV version of the film Susan Sullivan appears playing Matt Garth's girlfriend. Later video versions dropped Sullivan to emphasize the essentially all-male cast and wartime action.

As with many "carrier films" produced around this time, the US Navy Essex-class aircraft carrier USS Lexington played the part of both American and Japanese flattops for shipboard scenes.

Reception

Box office

Midway proved extremely popular with movie audiences, and opened at number one at the US box office with an opening weekend gross of  $4,356,666 from 311 theatres. It went on to gross over $43 million at the box office, becoming the tenth most popular movie of 1976 with theatrical rentals of  $20,300,000.

Critical response
Roger Ebert of the Chicago Sun-Times gave the film two-and-a-half stars out of four and wrote, "The movie can be experienced as pure spectacle, I suppose, if we give up all hopes of making sense of it. Bombs explode and planes crash and the theater shakes with the magic of Sensurround. But there's no real directorial intelligence at hand to weave the special effects into the story, to clarify the outlines of the battle and to convincingly account for the unexpected American victory." Vincent Canby of The New York Times wrote that "the movie blows up harmlessly in a confusion of familiar old newsreel footage, idiotic fiction war movie clichés, and a series of wooden-faced performances by almost a dozen male stars, some of whom appear so briefly that it's like taking a World War II aircraft-identification test." Arthur D. Murphy of Variety thought that the film "emerges more as a passingly exciting theme-park extravaganza than a quality motion picture action-adventure story ... Donald S. Sanford's cluttered script, while striving for the long-ago personal element, gets overwhelmed by its action effects." Gene Siskel of the Chicago Tribune gave the film two-and-a-half stars out of four and wrote that "[t]he battle scenes run hot and cold." He praised Henry Fonda as "absolutely convincing" but stated that Sanford "deserves a year in the brig for inserting amid the battle scenes a stupid subplot involving a young American sailor in love with a Japanese-American girl." Gary Arnold of The Washington Post called it a "tired combat epic" and wrote, "Hollywood may mean well, or imagine it does, but it's a little appalling to think that authentic acts of bravery and sacrifice have become the pretext for such feeble, inadequate dramatization. There is no serious attempt in 'Midway' to characterize the young men who fought on either side of this pivotal battle." Charles Champlin of the Los Angeles Times was mixed, describing it as "a disaster film whose disaster is war," with its principal strength being that it "keeps the lines of battle both straight and suspenseful in the viewer's mind." He too faulted the romance subplot as "hokey even beyond the demands of the form." Janet Maslin panned the film in Newsweek, stating that it "never quite decides whether war is hell, good clean fun, or merely another existential dilemma. This drab extravaganza toys with so many conflicting attitudes that it winds up reducing the pivotal World War II battle in the Pacific to utter nonsense."

Robert Niemi, author of History in the Media: Film and Television, stated that Midway'''s "clichéd dialogue" and an overuse of stock footage led the film to have a "shopworn quality that signalled the end of the heroic era of American-made World War II epics." He described the film as a "final, anachronistic attempt to recapture World War II glories in a radically altered geopolitical era, when the old good-versus-evil dichotomies no longer made sense."

On review aggregator website Rotten Tomatoes, the film has a 54% score based on 13 reviews, with an average rating of 5.9/10.

Television version
Shortly after its successful theatrical debut, additional fictional material was assembled and shot in standard 4:3 ratio for a TV version of the film, which aired on NBC. Although having nothing to do with the plot, a character was added: Susan Sullivan played Ann, the girlfriend of Captain Garth, adding depth to his reason for previously divorcing Ensign Garth's mother, and bringing further emotional impact to the fate of Captain Garth. The TV version also has Coral Sea battle scenes to help the plot build up to the decisive engagement at Midway. The TV version was 45 minutes longer than the theatrical film and aired over two nights. Mitchell Ryan was added as Rear Admiral Aubrey W. Fitch. Jack Smight directed the additional scenes.

In June 1992, a re-edit of the extended version, shortened to fill a three-hour time slot, aired on the CBS network to commemorate the 50th anniversary of the Midway battle. This version brought in successful ratings.

Part of this additional footage is available as a bonus feature on the Universal Pictures Home Entertainment DVD of Midway.

The film is recognized by American Film Institute in these lists:
 2006: AFI's 100 Years...100 Cheers – Nominated

 Historical accuracy 
More flag officers took part at the decision making and planning before the battle, not just Nimitz, Fletcher and Spruance. All the same, commanding officers' staffs were generally bigger than the one or two men portrayed in the movie. Admiral Ernest King, commander-in-chief of the navy, approved the Midway battle plan propounded by Nimitz. They were regularly in contact, so there was no need of sending fictional Capt. Vinton Maddox to consult Nimitz. There were numerous air attacks by Midway-based bombers on approaching Japanese fleets omitted by the script; these had the same effect as later carrier-based torpedo bombers destroyed by Japanese fleet air-defenses portrayed in the movie. The failure of the initial raids by land-based bombers only convinced Japanese commanders of their own invincibility and incompetency of US military.

During the American torpedo attacks, Admiral Chūichi Nagumo and his subordinates are shaken by the American pilots' unexpected bravery. Nagumo remarks "They sacrifice themselves like samurai, these Americans." Similar to Isoroku Yamamoto's sleeping giant quote from the 1970 film Tora! Tora! Tora!, there is no evidence that Nagumo made this statement. When the Akagi is bombed, Nagumo is stunned by the force of the bomb's blast and is unable to get up, being tended to by Genda. Witnesses saw Nagumo standing near the ship's compass looking out at the flames on his flagship and two other carriers in a state of shock. Nagumo's chief of staff, Rear Admiral Ryūnosuke Kusaka, was able to persuade him to leave the critically damaged Akagi. Nagumo, with a barely perceptible nod and tears in his eyes, agreed to go.

Later studies by Japanese and American military historians call into question key scenes, such as the dive-bombing attack that crippled the first three Japanese carriers. In the movie, American pilots jubilantly report that there are no fighters and the carrier decks are loaded with ammunition. As Jonathan Parshall and Anthony Tully write in Shattered Sword: The Untold Story of the Battle of Midway (2005), aerial photography from the battle showed nearly empty decks. Japanese carriers loaded armament onto planes below the flight deck, unlike American carriers (as depicted earlier in the film). The fact that a closed hangar full of armaments was hit by bombs made damage to Akagi more devastating than if planes, torpedoes and bombs were on an open deck. During the attack on the Japanese carriers, an American pilot reports, "Scratch one flat top!"

While most characters portray real persons, some of them are fictional though inspired by actual people. Captain Matt Garth and his son, Ensign Thomas Garth, are fictional. Garth's contribution to planning the battle is based rather faithfully on actual work of Lieutenant-Commander Edwin Layton. Layton served as Pacific fleet intelligence officer, spoke Japanese and was key to transposing raw outputs of cryptography analysis into meaningful intelligence for Nimitz and his staff. Layton was an old friend of Joseph Rochefort. Matt Garth's further exploits were pure fiction and resembled deeds of at least two more persons: first, an intelligence officer on Fletcher's Task Force 17 staff, and then the leader of the last attack made by dive bombers from USS Yorktown. The latter was actually performed by VB-3 dive bomber squadron led by LCDR Maxwell Leslie.

Historical footage and atelier shots of warplanes action are mostly inaccurate in the movie. Most of the original footage portrays later and/or different events and thus planes and ships that were not operational during the battle or did not take part. Among the first aircraft shown taking off to defend Midway are two Army P-40 Warhawks. There were no P-40s stationed at Midway, only Marine F4F Wildcats and F2A-3 Buffalos. In the second air attack on Yorktown, the movie shows two Japanese planes hitting the aircraft carrier. There were no plane crashes into ships in this battle. In addition, Yorktown was damaged beyond saving by Japanese torpedoes fired from a submarine which had penetrated the destroyer screen rather than the air attack seen in the film. This attack also sank a nearby destroyer, which exploded, sending more than 100 men into the sea and sinking in just four minutes. Like the USS Lexington used in filming, USS Midway'' is also preserved as a museum.

See also
 List of historical drama films
 List of historical drama films of Asia
 Midway (2019 film)

References

External links
 
 
 
 

1976 films
1970s action drama films
1970s historical films
1970s war films
American action drama films
American historical films
American war drama films
Films about the Battle of Midway
Works about Pacific theatre of World War II
Films produced by Walter Mirisch
Films scored by John Williams
Films set in the United States Minor Outlying Islands
Films set on ships
Films shot in California
Films shot in Florida
Films shot in Hawaii
Films shot in Los Angeles
Pacific War films
Seafaring films based on actual events
Films about the United States Navy in World War II
War epic films
World War II aviation films
World War II films based on actual events
Universal Pictures films
Epic films based on actual events
Films directed by Jack Smight
Historical epic films
Cultural depictions of Isoroku Yamamoto
1976 drama films
Japan in non-Japanese culture
Films set on aircraft carriers
1970s English-language films
1970s American films